is the 46th single by Japanese boy band Arashi. It was released on May 13, 2015. The single was released in two editions: a first press/limited edition and a regular edition. The first press/limited edition contains the B-side "Dandelion" and the music video and making-of for "Aozora no Shita, Kimi no Tonari" while the regular edition contains two B-sides, the instrumental for "Aozora no Shita, Kimi no Tonari" and an original talk track. It reached number-one on the weekly Oricon Singles Chart, selling 501,010 copies. It also reached number-one on the Billboard Japan Hot 100.

Single information
The first press/limited edition contains the B-side "Dandelion", the music video and making-of for "Aozora no Shita, Kimi no Tonari", and a 14-page photo lyrics booklet while the regular edition contains the B-sides "Kono Te no Hira ni" and "Nando datte", the instrumental for "Aozora no Shita, Kimi no Tonari" and an original talk track "Ura Ara Talk 2015". The album jacket covers for both versions are different.

"Aozora no Shita, Kimi no Tonari" was used as the theme song for the drama Yōkoso, Wagaya e starring Arashi member Aiba Masaki.

Track listing

Charts and certifications

Charts

Sales and certifications

Release history

References

External links
 Product information

2015 songs
2015 singles
Arashi songs
Oricon Weekly number-one singles
Billboard Japan Hot 100 number-one singles
J Storm singles